The 50th Daytime Emmy Awards, presented by the National Academy of Television Arts and Sciences (NATAS), will honor the best in U.S. daytime television programming in 2022. Nominations are scheduled to be announced in mid-April 2023. The award ceremony is planned to be held on June 16, 2023.

Category and rule changes
Following a realignment between the Daytime Emmy Awards and Primetime Emmy Awards for the 2022 ceremonies, the Academy of Television Arts & Sciences and the National Academy of Television Arts and Sciences announced in August 2022 that all categories for game shows would move to the primetime ceremony.

The maximum age limit for those eligible for Outstanding Younger Performer in a Drama Series has been lowered officially to 18.

The separate categories for "entertainment" and "informative" talk shows, and "entertainment" and "informative" talk show host, have been merged back into single talk show and talk show host categories, respectively. The categories have thus been re-named to the following: Outstanding  Daytime Talk Series and Outstanding Daytime Talk Series Host.

References

050
2023 in American television
2023 television awards
June 2023 events in the United States